Christopher Elijah Duque Newsome (born July 25, 1990) is a Filipino American professional basketball player for the Meralco Bolts of the Philippine Basketball Association (PBA).

Early life and high school career
Newsome was born in San Jose, California. He is the second child of Carmelita (née Duque), a Filipina, who hails from Parañaque and Eric, an African American. He has an older brother, Eric Jr. and younger sisters Nishelle and Melissa. When the Newsomes moved to Albuquerque, New Mexico, he attended his secondary education at Rio Rancho High School. His first sport was baseball and football, but did not play basketball until he reached seventh grade. He helped the Rio Rancho HS Rams win the 5A State Championship in 2007.

College career
Newsome attended the New Mexico Highlands University, an NCAA Division II school for three years. In his final season with the Cowboys in 2011, he averaged 10.1 points and 4.2 rebounds per outing. He was recruited by then-Ateneo head coach Norman Black to play for the Blue Eagles and for the Philippine national team that will play for the Southeast Asian Games. He accepted the offer and spent two years of residency (as per UAAP rules for foreign students) before finally seeing action for Ateneo in 2013. In his final season with the Blue Eagles, he posted averages of 14 PPG and 8 RPG while earning a spot among the UAAP Season 77 Mythical 5 team.

Amateur career
Newsome suited up for the Hapee Fresh Fighters in the PBA D-League, where he teamed up with fellow college standouts and future draft batchmates Troy Rosario, Baser Amer, Garvo Lanete and Scottie Thompson.  Together, they helped the Fresh Fighters win its first ever PBA D-League title in 2015.

Professional career
Newsome was drafted fourth overall by the Meralco Bolts in the 2015 PBA draft, reuniting with his former collegiate coach Norman Black. A few days after the draft, he signed a three-year deal with the Bolts.

In his PBA debut on October 28, 2015, he finished with a team-high-tying 14 points, including two on a highlight slam dunk over San Miguel's Arwind Santos. Newsome quickly rose to stardom. He participated in the PBA All-Star Weekend Slam Dunk Contest, making it to the final round only to lose to two-time defending champion, Rey Guevarra. He became a key player in Meralco's rotation as the season went on. He helped Meralco get to the Semi-Finals of the 2016 PBA Commissioner's Cup and to the Finals of the 2016 PBA Governors' Cup before eventually losing to the Barangay Ginebra San Miguel.

He was named as the PBA Rookie of the Year 2016 during the PBA Leo Awards Night. Other nominees for the league's newcomer trophy were Maverick Ahanmisi, Arthur dela Cruz, Troy Rosario and Moala Tautuaa.

Newsome started the 2016–17 Philippine Cup with a career-high 28 points with 10 rebounds in a win against the NLEX Road Warriors. After a six-game losing streak, he led the team to a win over the Rain or Shine Elasto Painters with 19 points and 6 assists. They didn't make the playoffs that conference, finishing with a 47-point loss to the Star Hotshots. That season, he was snubbed from the All-Star Game, but he was able to win his first Slam Dunk title, finishing just one point ahead of James Forrester. The Bolts made it to the playoffs of the Commissioner's Cup, losing to the TNT Katropa in the first round. In the Governors' Cup, he had 7 steals in a win against the Phoenix Fuel Masters. He finished the elimination round with a Player of the Week award, for averaging 21 points, 5.5 rebounds, 5.5 assists and 1 steal in 2 games and securing first place for the Bolts. He was also nominated for Best Player of the Conference, losing to Greg Slaughter. Meralco lost once again to Ginebra in the Finals.

In the 2018 Commissioner's Cup, Newsome had 30 points in a win against NLEX. He was snubbed once again from the 2018 All-Star Games. He competed once again in the Slam Dunk Contest, but this time didn't make it to the final round.

In the 2019 Governors' Cup, against Phoenix, he recorded his first triple-double with 13 points, 12 rebounds, and 11 assists. Against San Miguel, he was dangerously fouled by Kelly Nabong as he was going for a drive. Nabong was fined 30,000 pesos for those actions. The Bolts made it to the Finals, matching up with Ginebra once again. In Game 1, he scored 17 of his 24 points in the fourth quarter. Despite his efforts, Meralco lost that game. They would go on to lose in 5 games.

In the 2020 Philippine Cup, Newsome hit a buzzer-beating, baseline fadeaway jumper to give Meralco the win over the Terrafirma Dyip. In the playoffs, they upset the Beermen, but lost to Ginebra in the semis.

In a game against the Magnolia Hotshots, Newsome sank the game-winning layup and finished with 14 points. During the 2021 Philippine Cup, Newsome, along with teammate Cliff Hodge, was placed into the league's health and safety protocols, forcing them to miss two games. In his return from protocols, he was fined 20,000 pesos for the flagrant foul 2 he committed against Anthony Semerad. The Bolts made it to the semis once again, but this time lost to Magnolia in six games. In the Governors' Cup playoffs, they matched up against Magnolia once again. In Game 2, he scored 18 points to help Meralco tie up the series 1–1. He then teamed up with his backcourt partner Chris Banchero to take Game 3. The Bolts finally put Magnolia away in Game 5, as he scored 18 points (11 in the fourth quarter), 12 assists, eight rebounds, three steals, and a block. For that performance, he was awarded Player of the Week. They faced Ginebra in the Finals once again, and lost in six games.

Career statistics

College

Elimination rounds 

|-
| align="left" | 2013-14
| align="left" rowspan="2" | Ateneo
| 14 || 30.1 || .512 || .235 || .762 || 8.3 || 2.6 || .6 || .5 || 13.1
|-
| align="left" | 2014-15
| 14 || 30.4 || .436 || .462 || .744 || 7.9 || 2.6 || 1.3 || .9 || 13.5
|-class=sortbottom
| align="center" colspan=2 | Career
| 28 || 30.3 || .473 || .372 || .752 || 8.3 || 2.6 || .9 || .7 || 13.3

Playoffs 

|-
| align="left" | 2014-15
| align="left" | Ateneo
| 2 || 33.3 || .636 || 1.000 || .857 || 6.5 || 3.0 || 1.0 || 1.5 || 18.0
|-class=sortbottom
| align="center" colspan=2 | Career
| 2 || 33.3 || .636 || 1.000 || .857 || 6.5 || 3.0 || 1.0 || 1.5 || 18.0

PBA
As of the end of 2021 season

 
|-
| align=left | 
| align=left | Meralco
| 51 || 30.6 || .480 || .288 || .758 || 4.7 || 3.9 || 1.0 || .4  || 12.1
|-
| align=left | 
| align=left | Meralco
| 48 ||	35.1 || .450 || .291 || .760 || 6.0 || 5.0 || 1.2 || .4  || 13.3
|-
| align=left | 
| align=left | Meralco
| 41 ||	34.7 || .427 || .429 || .846 || 5.5 || 5.0 || .9 || .3 || 13.9
|-
| align=left | 
| align=left | Meralco
| 45 ||	35.8 || .441 || .283 || .813 || 5.8 || 3.8 || 1.1 || .3 || 14.6
|-
| align=left | 
| align=left | Meralco
| 18 ||	36.3 || .421 || .250 || .767 || 5.7 || 4.9 || 1.4 || .4 || 13.9
|-
| align=left | 
| align=left | Meralco
| 40 ||	34.8 || .408 || .320 || .797 || 5.2 || 5.0 || 1.2 || .4 || 13.0
|-class=sortbottom
| colspan="2" align="center" | Career
| 243 || 34.3 || .441 || .315 || .790 || 5.5 ||	4.5 || 1.1 || .3 || 13.4

National team career
Newsome was ineligible to play in most FIBA tournaments for the Philippines because of a rule that states players are eligible to play for their countries only if they acquired their respective passports before the age of 16. He was able to play for the Philippines in the 2019 SEA Games 3x3 tournament because of less restrictions. Along with teammates CJ Perez, Jason Perkins, and Moala Tautuaa, they helped the Philippines claim gold for that event, sweeping the tournament in the process.

In 2022, Newsome was cleared by FIBA to play as a local for the Philippines. This is because he was given an exemption because he has been living in the Philippines for over 10 years. He made his national team debut during the fourth window of the 2023 FIBA World Cup qualifiers.

Off the court
Newsome is also a columnist for the Philippine edition of NBA.com. He is also a photographer for the Bolts' social media accounts. In 2018, he was named as a brand ambassador for TAG Heuer.

References

Living people
1990 births
20th-century African-American people
21st-century African-American sportspeople
African-American basketball players
American men's basketball players
American sportspeople of Filipino descent
Ateneo Blue Eagles men's basketball players
Basketball players from San Jose, California
Citizens of the Philippines through descent
Competitors at the 2019 Southeast Asian Games
Filipino men's 3x3 basketball players
Filipino men's basketball players
Junior college men's basketball players in the United States
Meralco Bolts draft picks
Meralco Bolts players
New Mexico Highlands Cowboys basketball players
Philippine Basketball Association All-Stars
Philippines men's national basketball team players
Philippines national 3x3 basketball team players
Point guards
Shooting guards
Small forwards
Southeast Asian Games gold medalists for the Philippines
Southeast Asian Games medalists in 3x3 basketball